Oxyathres (in Old Persian Vaxšuvarda; lived 4th century BC) was a brother of the Persian king Darius III Codomannus. He was distinguished for his bravery, and in the battle of Issus, 333 BC, took a prominent part in the combat in defence of the king, when attacked by the Macedonian cavalry under Alexander himself, as shown in the celebrated Alexander Mosaic found in Pompeii. He afterwards accompanied Darius on his flight into Bactria, and fell into the hands of Alexander during the pursuit, but was treated with the utmost distinction by the conqueror, who even assigned him an honourable post about his own person; and subsequently devolved upon him the task of punishing his son Bessus for the murder of Darius. He was also the father of Amastris queen of Heraclea.

A description of Oxyathres at the Battle of Issus:

References
Smith, William (editor); Dictionary of Greek and Roman Biography and Mythology, "Oxathres (2)", Boston, (1867)

Notes

External links
Livius, Oxyathres by Jona Lendering

Achaemenid dynasty
4th-century BC Iranian people
Darius III
Military leaders of the Achaemenid Empire